Ian Field (born ) is a British cyclo-cross cyclist. He represented his nation in the 2016 men's elite event at the 2016 UCI Cyclo-cross World Championships in Heusden-Zolder. 

He has won the British National Cyclo-cross Championships on multiple occasions.

Major results

Cyclo-cross

2004–2005
 2nd National Under-23 Championships
2005–2006
 National Trophy Series
1st Abergavenny
3rd Cheltenham
2006–2007
 National Trophy Series
1st Cheltenham
2007–2008
 National Trophy Series
1st Bradford
3rd Ipswich
 2nd National Under-23 Championships
2008–2009
 National Trophy Series
1st Abergavenny
2nd Rutland
3rd Ipswich
3rd Exeter
2010–2011
 National Trophy Series
1st Southampton
1st Bradford
2011–2012
 1st  National Championships
 1st Burlington, VT
 1st Baltimore
 2nd Rochester, NY
 2nd Baltimore
 2nd Breinigsville
 3rd Gloucester, MA
2012–2013
 1st  National Championships
 National Trophy Series
1st Abergavenny
2nd Derby
 2nd Baltimore
 2nd Baltimore
2013–2014
 1st  National Championships
 National Trophy Series
1st Milton Keynes
1st Bradford
2014–2015
 1st  National Championships
 National Trophy Series
1st Shrewsbury
1st Southampton
1st Bradford
2nd Derby
2015–2016
 National Trophy Series
1st Southampton
1st Derby
1st Durham
1st Bradford
 2nd National Championships
2016–2017
 1st  National Championships
 1st  Overall National Trophy Series
1st Abergavenny
1st Houghton-Le-Spring
1st Shrewsbury
2nd Derby
2nd Ipswich
 1st Ripley
2017–2018
 1st  Overall National Trophy Series
1st Derby
1st Shrewsbury
2nd Abergavenny
3rd Gravesend
 2nd National Championships
2018–2019
 1st  Overall National Trophy Series
1st Irvine
2nd Ipswich
2nd Shrewsbury
3rd Crawley
2019–2020
 2nd Overall National Trophy Series
1st Milnthorpe
2nd Irvine
2021–2022
 National Trophy Series
2nd Callender Park
3rd Derby

References

External links
 

1986 births
Living people
Cyclo-cross cyclists
British male cyclists
Place of birth missing (living people)
21st-century British people